Acalolepta submaculata is a species of beetle in the family Cerambycidae. It was described by E. Forrest Gilmour in 1947. It is known from Sulawesi.

References

Acalolepta
Beetles described in 1947